Martina Navratilova and Selima Sfar were the defending champions but they chose not to compete together.

Navratilova partnered with Cara Black and defeated Sfar and her partner Arantxa Sánchez Vicario in the final, 6–2, 4–6, [10–4] to win the ladies' invitation doubles tennis title at the 2017 Wimbledon Championships.

Draw

Final

Group A
Standings are determined by: 1. number of wins; 2. number of matches; 3. in two-players-ties, head-to-head records; 4. in three-players-ties, percentage of sets won, or of games won; 5. steering-committee decision.

Group B
Standings are determined by: 1. number of wins; 2. number of matches; 3. in two-players-ties, head-to-head records; 4. in three-players-ties, percentage of sets won, or of games won; 5. steering-committee decision.

References
Ladies' Invitation Doubles

Women's Invitation Doubles